Illescas may refer to:

Places
 Illescas, San Luis Potosí, Mexico
 Illescas Peninsula, Peru
 Cerro Illescas, Peru
 Illescas, Toledo, a municipality in the province of Toledo, Castile-La Mancha, Spain
 Illescas, Florida, village in Uruguay
 Illescas, Lavalleja, village in Uruguay

People
 Fernando de Illescas (died 1419), Spanish Franciscan and diplomat
 Gonzalo de Illescas (bishop) (died 1464), Spanish monk and royal advisor
 Gonzalo de Illescas (historian) (1518–1583), Spanish historian
 Miguel Illescas (born 1965), Spanish chess Grandmaster

Sports
CB Illescas, Spanish professional basketball team